The Ramada Inn crash was an aircraft accident in which a United States Air Force pilot failed to reach the runway at Indianapolis International Airport and crashed into the Airport Ramada Inn in Indianapolis, Indiana.

Accident summary
On the morning of October 20, 1987, a United States Air Force A-7D-4-CV Corsair II, serial 69-6207, piloted by Major Bruce L. "Lips" Teagarden, 35, was en route to Nevada via Tinker Air Force Base, Oklahoma, after departing Pittsburgh International Airport earlier in the day. Controllers at Indianapolis routed Teagarden to Runway 5L, but due to the low cloud ceiling and poor visibility over Indianapolis, Teagarden was at  mean sea level when he came to the threshold and was forced to try to land on Runway 23L instead.

It struck the Bank One branch in the 5600 block of Bradbury Avenue, bounced off the roof, flew across the street and hit an embankment, went  airborne, and then crashed into the front of the Ramada Inn. Teagarden landed in the parking lot of the Ace Supply Company, four blocks from the hotel, suffering bruises and muscle strain.

As the plane crashed into the Ramada Inn, the cockpit and engine went into the lobby, killing nine people immediately or within minutes; another died 10 days later from burns.  The wings went into the upper floors of the top of the carport and upper floors of the hotel.  The aircraft's jet fuel ignited on impact, causing a fireball that covered the front of the hotel up to the fourth floor.  Indianapolis Airport crash trucks arrived on the scene a minute after impact, and firefighters used foam to bring the fire under control four minutes later.  Other elements of the Airport fire department searched the building for survivors, while assistance was requested from the Indianapolis Fire Department, Wishard Ambulance Service, the Wayne Township Fire Department, and the Decatur Township Fire Department.

Meanwhile, the hotel was evacuated by Ramada Inn staff and guests.

Teagarden was assigned to the 4450th Tactical Group, which at the time was clandestinely involved with the development of the Lockheed F-117 Nighthawk.

Aftermath
The Air Force paid $50,427 ($ when adjusted for inflation) in property claims damages, according to The New York Times.

Teagarden was grounded until a flight evaluation board held him blameless in the incident because of the controller's actions.

The cause of the crash, which was revealed in the Air Force's final report in January 1988, was a defective gear in the accessory gearbox. It sheared, causing the driveshaft to rip open the lubricating oil system, and the engine seized up soon afterward. Air Force mechanics had first noticed excessive wear on the driveshafts of a Corsair in November 1984, and subsequently two others. This prompted a safety directive to check driveshaft splines during compressor work on all in-service Corsairs.

The charred building stood for more than two years; the hotel owners never rebuilt because they were unable to decide on an appropriate design.  Currently, a parking lot stands on the site.  The bank branch damaged by the plane is still standing today. It has been converted to a hospice  and subsequently closed permanently as of 2022.

References

Aviation accidents and incidents in Indiana
1987 in military history
Aviation accidents and incidents in the United States in 1987
Fires in Indiana
1980s in Indianapolis
Accidents and incidents involving United States Air Force aircraft
1987 in sports in Indiana
Building and structure fires in the United States
November 1987 events in the United States
20th-century history of the United States Air Force